Enn Sellik (born 10 December 1954 in Iisaku Parish) is an Estonian former long-distance runner who competed, representing Soviet Union in the 1976 Summer Olympics and in the 1980 Summer Olympics.

He set his personal best in 10,000m run at the European championships in Prague in 1978, which still stands for the Estonian national record. His best in 5,000 metres run (13:17.2), achieved in Podolsk in 1976, is also counted as the current Estonian record.

References

External links

1954 births
Living people
People from Alutaguse Parish
Estonian male long-distance runners
Olympic athletes of the Soviet Union
Athletes (track and field) at the 1976 Summer Olympics
Athletes (track and field) at the 1980 Summer Olympics
Universiade medalists in athletics (track and field)
Universiade gold medalists for the Soviet Union
Medalists at the 1977 Summer Universiade
Soviet male long-distance runners